John Marston may refer to:

 John Marston (playwright) (1576–1634), English playwright, poet
 John Marston (sailor) (1795–1885), United States Navy officer
 John Westland Marston (1819–1890), English dramatist 
 John Marston (businessman) (1836–1918), English
 John Marston (USMC) (1884–1957), United States Marine Corps officer
 John Marston (cricketer) (1893–1938), Argentine-born English cricketer
 Jack Marston or John Marston (1948–2013), English rugby league footballer
 John Marston (Red Dead), a protagonist in the Red Dead Redemption Series. 

 series